Infanta Maria of Guimarães (12 August 1538 – 9 July 1577) was a Portuguese infanta, daughter of Infante Duarte, Duke of Guimarães (son of King Manuel I of Portugal), and Isabel of Braganza. She married  Alessandro Farnese, Duke of Parma and Piacenza on 11 November 1565. She was Hereditary Princess of Parma by marriage.

Issue

Ancestry

1538 births
1577 deaths
Portuguese infantas
Hereditary Princesses of Parma
House of Aviz
People from Lisbon
House of Farnese
Burials at the Sanctuary of Santa Maria della Steccata
16th-century Portuguese people